Dubrovnik Airline Limited was a Croatian charter airline, based in Dubrovnik, Croatia. It operated tourist charter flights from Europe and Israel to holiday destinations in Croatia. Its main base was Dubrovnik Airport.

History 

The airline was officially launched on 15 December 2004 by Croatian shipping company Atlantska Plovidba. It started operations in 2005. In 2006, Dubrovnik Airline carried 380,000 passengers while the first seven months of 2007, saw it transport 360,000 passengers. The airline was loss making since 2009 and ceased all operations on 23 October 2011 after defaulting on its debts thus declaring bankruptcy.

Destinations 

Dubrovnik Airline served the following destinations (at October 2011):

 Africa
Tunisia
Tunis - Tunis-Carthage International Airport

 Asia
Israel
Tel Aviv - Ben Gurion International Airport [seasonal]

 Europe
Austria
Salzburg - Salzburg Airport
Vienna - Vienna International Airport
Croatia
Dubrovnik - Dubrovnik Airport Base
Pula - Pula Airport
Split - Split Kaštela/Resnik Airport focus city
Zagreb - Zagreb International Airport focus city
Finland
Helsinki - Helsinki Airport
France
Lyon - Saint-Exupéry Airport
Nantes - Atlantique Airport
Paris - Charles de Gaulle Airport
Paris - Orly Airport
Toulouse - Toulouse Blagnac International Airport
Germany
Cologne - Cologne Bonn Airport
Munich - Munich Airport
Stuttgart - Stuttgart Airport
Greece
Athens - Athens Airport
Ireland
Cork - Cork Airport
Dublin - Dublin Airport
Knock - Ireland West Airport Knock
Shannon - Shannon Airport
Italy
Milan - Orio al Serio Airport
Pescara - Abruzzo International Airport
Rome - Leonardo da Vinci-Fiumicino Airport
Malta
Luqa - Malta International Airport
Netherlands
Amsterdam - Amsterdam Schiphol Airport
Norway
Oslo - Oslo Airport
Serbia
Belgrade - Belgrade Nikola Tesla Airport
Slovenia
Ljubljana - Ljubljana Jože Pučnik Airport
Spain
Barcelona - Barcelona International Airport
Bilbao - Bilbao Airport
Girona - Girona-Costa Brava Airport
Madrid - Madrid Barajas International Airport
Palma de Mallorca - Son Sant Joan Airport
Seville - San Pablo Airport
Sweden
Malmö - Malmö Airport
Stockholm - Stockholm-Arlanda Airport
Switzerland
Geneva - Geneva Cointrin International Airport
Zürich - Zürich Airport
Turkey
Antalya - Antalya Airport
United Kingdom
England
London - Gatwick Airport
Manchester - Manchester Airport
Scotland
Glasgow - Glasgow Prestwick Airport
Northern Ireland
Belfast - Belfast International

References

External links 

 

Defunct airlines of Croatia
Airlines established in 2004
Airlines disestablished in 2011
Defunct charter airlines
Companies based in Dubrovnik
Transport companies of Croatia
History of Dubrovnik
Croatian companies established in 2004